The International Journal of Japanese Sociology is an annual peer-reviewed academic journal published by Wiley-Blackwell on behalf of the Japan Sociological Society. The journal was established in 1992 and covers sociological topics as they relate to Japan, including policy, community, family, law, and class in urban and rural environments.

External links 
 

Wiley-Blackwell academic journals
English-language journals
Publications established in 1992
Annual journals
Sociology journals